Located in the Southeast United States, Tennessee is a state as diverse as its landscapes. Politically, Tennessee is broken up into three Grand Divisions: East, Middle, and West Tennessee. Physically, Tennessee is also separated into three main types of landforms: river valley plain, highlands and basins, and mountains.

Nature centers 
The environment of Tennessee includes the nature centers of Discovery Center at Murfree Spring,  Lichterman Nature Center and Owl's Hill Nature Center. In addition to these nature centers, there are many more options throughout the state like those in the capital of Nashville. These include Beaman Park Nature Center, Bells Bend Outdoor Center, Shelby Bottoms Nature Center, and Warner Park Natural Center.

Flora 
 Astragalus bibullatus
 Eriogonum longifolium var. harperi
 Isoetes lacustris
 Rock gnome lichen
 Sarracenia oreophila
 Utricularia inflata
 Utricularia radiata

Trees 
Abies fraseri
Ulmus serotina

Climate change in Tennessee

Global warming in the United States has been a salient topic since the Kyoto Protocol, as part of the United Nations Framework Convention on Climate Change, that was established in 1992. The effects of global warming have been widely debated; however, there is evidence that suggests a slight increase in the core temperature of most states. In addition there seems to be a number of effects on ecological systems throughout the United States. In the state of Tennessee, one of the key effects of global warming seems to be the radical changes to the geological composition as well as wildlife health of the Ohio-Tennessee Basin.

Some of the changes to the Ohio-Tennessee Basin include:
 The over enrichment of nutrients in the basin
 A decrease in the size of the basin as measured by the surface area of the watershed
 An increase in the pollutant concentration of the water
Some key legislation that works to address global warming in Tennessee is as follows:

Executive Order 54 establishes the Energy Policy Task Force with the goal of creating a new state energy plan by December 1 of 2008.

Another order establishes the Interagency Alternative Fuels Working Group with the goal of making Tennessee a leader in the biofuels industry.  The Working Group came up with an Alternative Fuels Strategic Plan which lays out goals for increasing biofuel and feedstock production and displacing petroleum use.

Public Chapter 489 (2007) requires all agencies and state educational institutions to create plans by January 1, 2008 to reduce or displace petroleum use in government fleet vehicles by 20%.

See also 
 Geology of Tennessee
 List of Superfund sites in Tennessee

References

External links 
 Tennessee Department of Environment and Conservation.
 Division of Air Pollution Control
 Tennessee Department of Transportation 
 Southeast Alternative Fuels Taskforce